Nyle is a given name. Notable people with the given name include:

Nyle DiMarco (born 1989), American model and actor
Nyle Godsmark (born 1992), Scottish rugby union player
Nyle McFarlane (1935–1986), American football player
Nyle Salmans, American football coach
Nyle Wiren (born 1973), American football player
Nyle Wolfe (born 1971), American singer

See also
Nyles Lannon (born 1977), American musician
Jewel De'Nyle (born 1976), American actress